Devil's Lake State Park may refer to the following:
Devils Lake State Parks (North Dakota), consisting of:
Grahams Island State Park
Black Tiger Bay State Recreation Area
Devils Lake State Recreation Area in Oregon, formerly known as Devil's Lake State Park
Devil's Lake State Park (Wisconsin)

See also
 Devil's Den State Park, Arkansas
 Devils Fork State Park, South Carolina
 Devil's Hopyard State Park, Connecticut
 Devil's Millhopper Geological State Park, Florida